is a Japanese light novel series written by Midori Yūma and illustrated by Laruha. Fujimi Shobo have published eleven volumes since 2015 under their Fujimi L Bunko imprint. A manga adaptation with art by Waco Ioka has been serialized in Enterbrain's josei manga magazine B's Log Comic since 2016. It has been collected in seven tankōbon volumes. A 26-episode anime television series adaptation by Gonzo aired from April 2 to September 24, 2018.

Plot

Aoi Tsubaki is a college student who has the ability to see Ayakashi, a trait she inherited from her deceased grandfather. One day, when Aoi walks past a torii shrine, she sees an Ayakashi sitting there who announces that it is hungry. However, after giving it food, Aoi is kidnapped by the Ayakashi, an Ogre called Odanna. He takes her to the Hidden Realm, a world where all the Ayakashi live. He tells Aoi that her grandfather owed him a debt, and as compensation, she must marry him. Aoi negotiates with the Ogre instead, asking to work at the ogre's inn, the Tenjin'ya.

Media

Light novel

Manga
Viz Media announced at their Anime Central 2018 panel that they had licensed the manga.

A new manga adaptation illustrated by Tsugaru Toba began serialization in Monthly Shōnen Sirius on January 26, 2023.

Anime

An anime television series adaptation was announced in November 2017. The series is directed by Yoshiko Okuda at Gonzo, with scripts handled by Tomoko Konparu, characters designs done by Yōko Satō and music composed by Takurō Iga. It aired from April 2 to September 24, 2018, on the Tokyo MX and BS Fuji stations. It ran for two cours, with 26 episodes. Both Crunchyroll and Funimation streamed the series.

The anime currently covers Volume 1 through Volume 5 of the light novel series.

Stage play
A stage play adaptation was announced in March 2018 during a pre-screening event for the anime adaptation.

Reception
As of October 2017, the light novel has over 340,000 copies in print.

References

External links
 Kakuriyo: Bed and Breakfast for Spirits at Funimation
  
 
 

2015 Japanese novels
Anime and manga based on light novels
Book series introduced in 2015
Cooking in anime and manga
Enterbrain manga
Fujimi L Bunko
Funimation
Gonzo (company)
Josei manga
Kadokawa Dwango franchises
Kodansha manga
Light novels
Muse Communication
Romantic comedy anime and manga
Supernatural anime and manga
Tokyo MX original programming
Viz Media manga
Yōkai in anime and manga